The Australian longnose skate (Dentiraja confusa) is a species of skate of the family Rajidae native waters off eastern Australia – New South Wales, Victoria and Tasmania.

References 

Rajiformes
Marine fish of Southern Australia
Fish described in 2008
Taxa named by Peter R. Last